Copelatus compertus is a species of diving beetle. It is part of the genus Copelatus in the subfamily Copelatinae of the family Dytiscidae. It was described by Guignot in 1956.

References

compertus
Beetles described in 1956